is a city located in Osaka Prefecture, Japan. , the city had an estimated population of 119,069 in 63029 households and a population density of 9700 persons per km².

Geography
Kadoma is located in the east-central part of Osaka Prefecture, adjacent to the Osaka metropolis, of which it is a satellite city. The city is approximately 4.9 kilometers east-west by 4.3 kilometers north-south, with the Furukawa River running through the center.

Neighboring municipalities
Osaka Prefecture
Osaka (Tsurumi-ku)
 Moriguchi
 Daitō
 Neyagawa

Climate
Kadoma has a Humid subtropical climate (Köppen Cfa) characterized by warm summers and cool winters with light to no snowfall.  The average annual temperature in Kadoma is 15.6 °C. The average annual rainfall is 1475 mm with September as the wettest month. The temperatures are highest on average in August, at around 27.7 °C, and lowest in January, at around 4.2 °C.

Demographics
Per Japanese census data, the population of Kadoma rose very rapidly in the 1960s peaked around 1990  and has since started a mild decline.

History
The area of the modern city of Kadoma was within ancient Kawachi Province.  During the Jōmon period, this area was under Kawachi Bay,and inlet of Osaka Bay. During the Yayoi period the bay became a lake and various settlements arose on its shores. Dotaku ritual objects and kofun burial mounds were built, and the Kojiki and Nihon Shoki record that Emperor Nintoku ordered the construction of an embankment to control repeated flooding of the Yodo River, the early known of such projects in Japan. During the Heian period, large shōen landed estates were established, and in the Kamakura and Muromachi period, the entire area of the city was under cultivation. During the Edo Period, due to its proximity to Kyoto and Osaka, most of the area was held as tenryō territory under the direct control of the Tokugawa shogunate. The village of Kadoma, was established within Matta District with the creation of the modern municipalities system on April 1, 1889.  On April 1, 1896 the area became part of Kitakawachi District, Osaka. On April 1,1939 Kadoma raised to town status. The neighboring villages of Owada and Shinomiya were absorbed on September 30, 1956. On August 1, 1963 Kadoma was raised to city status. Plans to merge Kadoma with the neighboring city of Moriguchi were rejected overwhelming by local residents of both cities in 2005.

Government
Kadoma has a mayor-council form of government with a directly elected mayor and a unicameral city council of 20 members. Kadoma contributes one member to the Osaka Prefectural Assembly. In terms of national politics, the city is part of Osaka 6th district of the lower house of the Diet of Japan.

Economy

Kadoma was traditionally known as the "breadbasket"of Osaka and was especially noted for its lotus roots. Due to its proximity to the Osaka metropolis and multiple transportation connections, Kadoma is now largely a commuter town. However, a number of large corporations have the headquarters and head factories in the city, including Panasonic Corporation, Tiger Corporation and Kaiyodo have their headquarters in Kadoma.

Education
Kadoma has 14 public elementary schools and six public middle schools operated by the city government and two public high schools operated by the Osaka Prefectural Department of Education. The prefecture also operates one special education school for the handicapped.

Transportation

Railways
 Keihan Electric Railway –  Keihan Main Line
 -  -  -  -  
 Osaka Metro -  Nagahori Tsurumi-ryokuchi Line

 Osaka Monorail - Main Line

Highways
  Kinki Expressway

Twin town – sister city relations

Kadoma is twinned with:
 Eindhoven, Netherlands (1967)
 Kami, Japan (1975, with former Muraoka town)
 São José dos Campos, Brazil (1973)

Local attractions
Namihaya Dome

Notable people from Kadoma
Kijūrō Shidehara, Japanese diplomat and prime minister
Kenichi Yamamoto, mixed martial artist
 Yuta Nakamoto, one of the 2 Japanese members of South Korean male idol group NCT.
 Ryo Nishikido, Japanese singer-songwriter and actor

References

External links

 Kadoma City official website 

 
Cities in Osaka Prefecture